Barnard E. Bee may refer to:

 Barnard E. Bee Sr. (1787–1853), early settler and political leader in the Republic of Texas
 Barnard Elliott Bee Jr. (1824–1861), United States Army officer and Confederate States Army general during the American Civil War